Two Mexican radio stations bear the XHSD-FM callsign:

XHSD-FM (Guanajuato), 99.3 "@FM" in Silao/León, Guanajuato
XHSD-FM (Sonora), 100.3 FM "Stereo 100.3" in Hermosillo, Sonora